Stanley DeSantis (July 6, 1953 – August 9, 2005) was an American actor and businessman.

DeSantis was raised in the Chicago area, and graduated from Thornton Township High School in 1971. He appeared in several motion pictures, including Candyman (1992), Ed Wood (1994), Boogie Nights (1997), Rush Hour (1998), I Am Sam (2001), and The Aviator  (2004). He also made many television appearances. 

When not acting, DeSantis owned and managed a clothing-and-memorabilia business, Passing 4 Sane, and a novelty soap company, Bubbletown, both of which were primarily involved in licensed characters.

According to his death notice in The Advocate, DeSantis was openly gay. He died of cardiac arrest in August 2005, and his death was noted in a dedication for the season two finale of Entourage, in which he guest starred in three episodes.

Selected filmography

 The Paper Chase (1978–1979, TV series) as Gagarian, a law student
 Fame (1982, TV series) as The Director
 Black Moon Rising (1986) as The Mover
 Just Say Julie (1988-1992) as The Devil and Various 
 Moonlighting (1989, TV series) as Desk Clerk
 ALF (1990, TV series) as Minister
 Vital Signs (1990) as Loan Officer
 Taking Care of Business (1990) as Airport Car Rental Man
 thirtysomething (1991, TV series) as Ad Person
 Caged Fear (1991) as Mr. O Daniels
 Candyman (1992) as Dr. Burke
 Doppelganger (1993) as Richard Wolf
 Tales of the City (1993, TV mini-series) as Norman Neal Williams
 My So-Called Life (1994, 3 episodes: "Pilot", "Guns and Gossip," "The Substitute") as Mr. Demitri / Social Studies Teacher
 Ed Wood (1994) as Mr. Feldman 
 The Birdcage (1996) as TV Man in Van
 The Truth About Cats & Dogs (1996) as Mario
 The Fan (1996) as Stoney
 Early Edition (1996, TV series) as Howard Phillips
 Fools Rush In (1997) as Judd Marshall
 NYPD Blue (1997, TV series) as Dr. Herbert Wentzel
 Clockwatchers (1997) as Art
 Boogie Nights (1997) as Buck's Manager
 After the Game (1997) as Frank Bertini
 Bulworth (1998) as Manny Liebowitz
 Rush Hour (1998) as FBI Gate Guard #1
 Heartwood (1998) as Gerry Talbot
 Tracey Takes On... (1998–1999, TV series) as Bobby / Albert Pittman
 Stark Raving Mad (1999, TV series) as Jonathan Dalton
 Lansky (1999, TV movie) as Arnold Rothstein
 Head Over Heels (2001) as Alfredo
 See Jane Run (2001)
 The Man Who Wasn't There (2001) as New Man's Customer 
 Human Nature (2001) as Doctor 
 I Am Sam (2001) as Robert
 Die, Mommie, Die! (2003) as Tuchman
 Curb Your Enthusiasm (2004, TV series) as Stanley
 The Aviator (2004) as Louis B. Mayer
 Entourage (2004–2005, TV series) as Scott Wick
 Six Feet Under (2005, TV series) as Peter Burns
 Something New (2006) as Jack Pino (final film role)

References

External links
 

1953 births
2005 deaths
Male actors from New York (state)
American male film actors
American male television actors
People from Roslyn, New York
20th-century American businesspeople
20th-century American male actors